Sacerdote is Italian, Spanish and Portuguese for "priest". It may also refer to:

 Sacerdote (surname), Italian surname
El sacerdote, a 1978 Spanish film

See also
 
Sacerdos (disambiguation)
Sacerdotalis (disambiguation)
Sacerdotalism, belief that propitiatory sacrifices for sin require the intervention of a priest